Putuo District is the name of two districts. It may refer to:

 Putuo District, Shanghai
 Putuo District, Zhoushan, Zhejiang

See also
 Putao District, Kachin State, Burma
 Putuo (disambiguation)